The World Allround Speed Skating Championships for Men took place on 15 and 16 February 1986 in Inzell at the Ludwig Schwabl Stadion ice rink.

Title holder was the Netherlander Hein Vergeer.

Classification

  * = Fell
 NC = Not qualified for the 10000 m (only the best 16 were qualified)

Source:

References

World Allround Speed Skating Championships, 1986
1986 World Allround

Attribution
In Dutch